Yakushimaru is a Japanese surname. Notable people with the surname include:

, Japanese singer
, Japanese singer and actress

See also
8940 Yakushimaru, main-belt asteroid

Japanese-language surnames